is a district located in Okayama Prefecture, Japan.

As of 2020 the district has an estimated population of 10,886 and a population density of 40.50 persons per km2. The total area is 268.8 km2.

Towns and villages 
Kibichūō - Merger of two towns: Kamogawa from Mitsu District, and Kayō from Jōbō District on October 1, 2004

References

Districts in Okayama Prefecture